Gap Broadcasting Group was a group of companies that owned around 116 broadcast stations (including 1 low-power television station and 5 low-power stations) in 23 radio markets in northwestern and central southern United States in the late 2000s.  Managed by Oaktree Capital Management, the group acquired mainly stations from Clear Channel Communications (now iHeartMedia as of late 2014) in the mid-sized radio markets that Clear Channel was exiting.  All Gap Broadcasting Group stations were acquired by Oaktree's Townsquare Media in August 2010.

Operating companies
 Gap Broadcasting, which became Gap Central Broadcasting and was also known as Gap I, was based in Dallas, Texas and acquired stations in the south-central states of Arkansas, Louisiana, Oklahoma, and Texas.  It also owned Class A television station KJEF-CA at Jennings, Louisiana.
 GapWest Broadcasting, also known as Gap II, was based in Greenwood Village, Colorado and acquired stations in 13 markets in Idaho, Minnesota, Montana, Washington, and Wyoming.
 A third operating company, Gap Broadcasting III or GAP East, was founded in 2009 to acquire stations east of the Mississippi River, but ended up without any acquisitions.

Stations
As of May 2010, just before being acquired by Townsquare, Gap Broadcasting Group owned the following stations:

Gap Central also owned low-power television station KJEF-CA at Jennings, Louisiana (Facility ID 53643).  It was also in the process of acquiring KTXN-FM at Victoria, Texas (Facility ID 13984), which it programmed under a local marketing agreement.  GapWest programmed station KLMI at Rock River, Wyoming (Facility ID 164207) under a local marketing agreement.

References

Defunct radio broadcasting companies of the United States
Defunct companies based in Colorado
Defunct companies based in Texas
Companies based in Dallas
Companies based in Greenwood Village, Colorado
Mass media companies established in 2008
Mass media companies disestablished in 2010
Oaktree Capital Management media holdings